Rowshanabad may refer to:
 Rowshanabad, Kerman
 Rowshanabad, Kohgiluyeh and Boyer-Ahmad
 Rowshanabad, Mazandaran
 Rowshanabad, Razavi Khorasan
 Rowshanabad, South Khorasan

See also
Roshanabad (disambiguation)